The 2014 NASCAR Nationwide Series was the 33rd season of the Nationwide Series, a stock car racing series sanctioned by the NASCAR in the United States. It began with the DRIVE4COPD 300 at Daytona International Speedway on February 22, and ended with the Ford EcoBoost 300 at Homestead-Miami Speedway on November 15. This was also the final year that the Nationwide Mutual Insurance Company sponsored the series, opting for increased involvement in the Sprint Cup Series, as well as the final season the series was broadcast by ESPN. Ford entered the season as the defending Manufacturer's Champion. After 2014, Xfinity became the series sponsor.

Teams and drivers

Complete schedule

Limited schedule

Notes

Driver changes
Between the 2013 and 2014 seasons, several driver changes have occurred. Kevin Harvick will run with JR Motorsports for 13 races. Numerous drivers will move up to the Nationwide Series full-time; Brendan Gaughan, Ty Dillon, Ryan Reed, Dakoda Armstrong, Landon Cassill, as well as 2012 ARCA champion Chris Buescher, and his cousin James Buescher, the 2012 NASCAR Camping World Truck Series champion. Maryeve Dufault will contest a limited schedule. Sam Hornish Jr. moves from Penske Racing to Joe Gibbs Racing, where he will share a ride with Kyle Busch.
Kyle Busch Motorsports will not field any cars in 2014 due to lack of funding.

Schedule

The calendar was released on October 18, 2013.

Results and standings

Races

Drivers' championship

(key) Bold – Pole position awarded by qualifying time. Italics – Pole position earned by points standings or practice time. * – Most laps led

Owners' championship (Top 15)
(key) Bold - Pole position awarded by time. Italics - Pole position set by final practice results or rainout. * – Most laps led.

Manufacturers' championship

See also
 2014 NASCAR Sprint Cup Series
 2014 NASCAR Camping World Truck Series
 2014 ARCA Racing Series
 2014 NASCAR K&N Pro Series East
 2014 NASCAR K&N Pro Series West
 2014 NASCAR Whelen Modified Tour
 2014 NASCAR Whelen Southern Modified Tour
 2014 NASCAR Canadian Tire Series
 2014 NASCAR Toyota Series
 2014 NASCAR Whelen Euro Series

References

NASCAR Xfinity Series seasons